Hristo Ivanov Mitov (born 24 January 1985) is a Bulgarian footballer who currently plays for Bulgarian Third League club Sevlievo as a goalkeeper. He had previously played for Conegliano German, Lokomotiv Mezdra and Chavdar Etropole.

References

External links

1985 births
Living people
Bulgarian footballers
PFC Lokomotiv Mezdra players
FC Chavdar Etropole players
FC Botev Vratsa players
First Professional Football League (Bulgaria) players
Association football goalkeepers
People from Vratsa
21st-century Bulgarian people